is a studio album by Australian singer John Farnham. The album was released in Australia in August 2000, and is Farnham's first studio release since Romeo's Heart in 1996. This album debuted at No. 1 in the ARIA Charts.

On 27 November 2000, a DVD version of the album was released which contained bonus footage, including behind the scenes, band interviews, and a documentary on the making of the album.

Track listing

DVD track listing

Personnel
Credited to:
 John Farnham – vocals
 Lisa Edwards – vocals
 Lindsay Field – vocals
 Stuart Fraser – guitars
 Chong Lim – keyboards, additional brass arrangements
 Joe Creighton – bass, vocals
 Angus Burchall – drums
 Steve Williams – tenor sax, baritone sax, brass arrangements
 Bob Coassin – trumpet, flugelhorn
 Lex Tier – trombone

Charts

Weekly charts

Year-end charts

Certifications

Release history

See also
 List of number-one albums of 2000 (Australia)

References 

2000 albums
John Farnham albums